Carlos Francisco Delfino (born August 29, 1982) is an Argentine-Italian professional basketball player for Victoria Libertas Pesaro of the Italian Lega Basket Serie A (LBA). He holds dual citizenship in both Italy and Argentina. He is also noted for his defense and three point shooting skills.

Professional career

Early years
The son of Carlos and Cristina Delfino, he began his professional career playing in the Argentine Basketball League for Olimpia de Venado Tuerto in the 1998–99 season, and he then transferred to Unión de Santa Fe in 1999–2000.

Italian clubs
Delfino moved to Italy in 2000 and played four seasons in the Italian A League, the first two with Reggio Calabria and the other two seasons with Skipper Bologna.

In his first season in Italy, he played for Reggio Calabria. In just under 21 minutes per game he averaged 8.8 points, 2.5 rebounds and 1.9 steals. He scored a season-high 25 points in his second game against Scavolini Pesaro, making five of eight three-point attempts. He scored 15 points in just 20 minutes against Cordivari Roseto and tallied 14 points apiece against Paf Bologna, Muller Verona and Kinder Bologna. He hit at least one three-pointer in 19 of 24 games.

In his first season with Skipper Bologna, he moved into the starting lineup in the third game of the season and averaged about 26 minutes. He scored 18 points, including shooting 3-of-5 from three-point range, versus Euro Roseto and posted double-doubles against Benetton Treviso (13 points, 13 rebounds), Oregon Scientific Cantù (15 points, 11 rebounds) and Pippo Milano (14 points, 11 rebounds). He suffered torn ligaments in his ankle late in the season, but returned in late May.

Detroit Pistons (2004–2007)
Beginning in 2004, Delfino signed to play for the Detroit Pistons of the National Basketball Association, who made him the 25th pick in the first round of the 2003 NBA draft, making him the first Argentine player ever to be selected in the first round of the NBA draft. In November 2004, he suffered a knee injury that kept him on the injured list for over three months. He had an operation in the U.S. and then another in Argentina, where he recovered. However, Delfino did not immediately return to form after his rehabilitation, and was left off the Pistons' 2005 playoff roster. After he recovered from the knee injury, Delfino averaged 15.3 minutes, 3.9 points, 1.8 rebounds, and 1.3 assists per game in 30 games under coach Larry Brown. Many regarded Brown as having limited space for Delfino's offensive creativity. It was perceived that under the Pistons upcoming new coach Flip Saunders, that Delfino would thrive.

In his second season on the Pistons' active roster, Carlos averaged 10.7 minutes, 3.6 points, 1.7 rebounds, and 0.6 assists per game. Delfino played off the bench substituting for either Tayshaun Prince or Richard Hamilton. He had three straight games where he scored in double digits before being sidelined for the next 4 with the flu. Delfino became an important change-of-pace player in Flip Saunders' offensive scheme.

Toronto Raptors
On June 15, 2007, the Detroit Pistons traded Delfino to the Toronto Raptors for 2nd-round draft picks in both the 2009 NBA draft and the 2011 NBA draft. The 2007–08 season was his most productive in the NBA, as he averaged 9 points, 4.4 rebounds and 1.8 assists per game during the regular season.

On June 16, 2009, the Toronto Raptors extended a qualifying offer to Delfino.

Khimki
In the summer of 2008, Delfino signed a 3-year contract with the Russian Super League club Khimki Moscow Region. Delfino was one of the highest-paid basketball players in Europe, earning about US$10 million per season, plus a house, a car and a driver, and savings on taxes. He averaged 13.0 points, 3.6 rebounds, 2.6 assists, and 1.5 steals per game in Europe's secondary level competition, the EuroCup, during the 2008–09 season.

Milwaukee Bucks (2009–2012)
On August 18, 2009, the Raptors signed and traded Delfino to the Milwaukee Bucks along with Roko Ukić in exchange for Amir Johnson and Sonny Weems.

Delfino had a breakout season with the Bucks, as he posted career highs in points per game, rebounds per game, assists per game, steals per game and blocks per game, while playing 30 minutes per game. He also played a major role in the playoffs, shooting a career-high .405 from behind the 3-point line.

Houston Rockets (2012–2013)
On August 20, 2012, Delfino signed with the Houston Rockets. After being a starter for three years in Milwaukee, Delfino became the sixth man for the Rockets in 2012–13. On June 30, 2013, Delfino was waived by the Rockets.

Delfino's final NBA game ever was during Game 5 of the 2013 Western Conference First Round on May 1st, 2013. In that game, Houston would defeat the Oklahoma City Thunder 107 - 100 with Delfino playing for 10 minutes and the only stat he recorded was 1 assist.

On July 17, 2013, Delfino signed with the Milwaukee Bucks. However, he never appeared in a game for the Bucks during the 2013–14 season due to a broken foot.

On August 26, 2014, Delfino was traded, along with Miroslav Raduljica and a 2015 second-round draft pick, to the Los Angeles Clippers in exchange for Jared Dudley and a 2017 conditional first-round draft pick. Three days later, he was waived by the Clippers.

Boca Juniors (2017)
On March 6, 2017, Delfino signed with the Argentine team Boca Juniors.

Baskonia (2017)
On September 27, 2017, Delfino signed with Spanish club Baskonia. On October 26, 2017, Delfino finished his stint with Baskonia.

Fiat Torino (2018–2019)
On July 3, 2018, Delfino came back to Italy after 14 years and signed a deal with Italian club Auxilium Torino.

Fortitudo Pallacanestro Bologna 103 (2019)
On February 27, 2019, Delfino returned to Bologna and signed on the Lavoropiù Bologna.

Victoria Libertas Pesaro (2020-present)
After one year where Delfino didn't play anywhere, Jasmin Repeša, new coach of VL Pesaro, wanted him in his new team and he was the first hire for the season 2020-21 for Pesaro.

National team career
Delfino was a member of Argentina's junior national team that won the bronze medal at the 2001 FIBA Under-21 World Championship that was held in Saitama, Japan. Delfino was also a part of the senior Argentine national basketball team that won the gold at the 2004 Summer Olympics. He also played with Argentina's senior national team at the 2006 FIBA World Championship and at the 2008 Summer Olympics, where he helped Argentina to win the bronze medal. 

In 2011, he won the gold medal in the 2011 FIBA Americas Championship, held in Mar del Plata.

After years of absence following injury, he played with Argentina's senior basketball team at the 2016 Summer Olympics.

In 2022, Delfino won the gold medal in the 2022 FIBA AmeriCup held in Recife, Brazil. He was the Argentina´s starting small forward in the tournament

Career statistics

NBA

Regular season

|-
| align="left" | 
| align="left" | Detroit
| 30 || 4 || 15.3 || .359 || .257 || .575 || 1.8 || 1.3 || .7 || .2 || 3.9
|-
| align="left" | 
| align="left" | Detroit
| 68 || 1 || 10.7 || .403 || .333 || .672 || 1.7 || .6 || .3 || .2 || 3.6
|-
| align="left" | 
| align="left" | Detroit
| 82 || 1 || 16.7 || .415 || .333 || .787 || 3.2 || 1.1 || .6 || .1 || 5.2
|-
| align="left" | 
| align="left" | Toronto
| 82 || 0 || 23.5 || .397 || .382 || .744 || 4.4 || 1.8 || .8 || .1 || 9.0
|-
| align="left" | 
| align="left" | Milwaukee
| 75 || 66 || 30.4 || .408 || .367 || .782 || 5.3 || 2.7 || 1.1 || .3 || 11.0
|-
| align="left" | 
| align="left" | Milwaukee
| 49 || 40 || 32.4 || .390 || .370 || .800 || 4.1 || 2.3 || 1.6 || .2 || 11.5
|-
| align="left" | 
| align="left" | Milwaukee
| 54 || 53 || 28.5 || .402 || .360 || .792 || 3.9 || 2.3 || 1.5 || .2 || 9.0
|-
| align="left" | 
| align="left" | Houston
| 67 || 5 || 25.2 || .405 || .375 || .857 || 3.3 || 2.0 || 1.0 || .1 || 10.6
|- class="sortbottom"
| style="text-align:center;" colspan="2"| Career
| 507 || 170 || 22.8 || .401 || .365 || .758 || 3.6 || 1.7 || .9 || .2 || 8.1

Playoffs

|-
| align="left" | 2006
| align="left" | Detroit
| 8 || 0 || 4.0 || .167 || .500 || 1.000 || .5 || .3 || .1 || .0 || .6
|-
| align="left" | 2007
| align="left" | Detroit
| 16 || 0 || 8.4 || .405 || .188 || .667 || 1.3 || .5 || .3 || .1 || 2.3
|-
| align="left" | 2008
| align="left" | Toronto
| 5 || 0 || 24.2 || .405 || .267 || .900 || 4.8 || 2.2 || .8 || .0 || 8.6
|-
| align="left" | 2010
| align="left" | Milwaukee
| 7 || 7 || 32.3 || .356 || .405 || .750 || 4.0 || 2.6 || .7 || .3 || 10.0
|-
| align="left" | 2013
| align="left" | Houston
| 5 || 0 || 24.0 || .375 || .355 || 1.000 || 2.4 || 2.0 || .6 || .2 || 9.0
|- class="sortbottom"
| style="text-align:center;" colspan="2"| Career
| 41 || 7 || 15.5 || .373 || .337 || .846 || 2.2 || 1.2 || .4 || .1 || 4.9

EuroLeague

|-
| align="left" | 2002–03
| align="left" | Bologna
| 16 || 15 || 31.8 || .393 || .291 || .673 || 7.1 || 1.7 || 1.7 || .3 || 12.0 || 13.4
|-
| align="left" | 2003–04
| align="left" | Bologna
| 21 || 16 || 30.9 || .414 || .338 || .778 || 6.0 || 2.2 || 1.7 || .1 || 12.4 || 13.7
|-
| align="left" | 2017–18
| align="left" | Baskonia
| 2 || 0 || 5.0 || .000 || .000 || .000 || 1.0 || 0.0 || 0.0 || 0.0 || 0.0 || 0.0
|- class="sortbottom"
| style="text-align:center;" colspan="2"| Career
| 39 || 31 || 31.3 || .405 || .314 || .732 || 6.5 || 2.0 || 1.7 || .2 || 12.2 || 13.6

References

External links

 
 Carlos Delfino at euroleague.net
 Carlos Delfino at acb.com 
 Carlos Delfino at legabasket.it 
 Carlos Delfino at lastinbasket.com

1982 births
Living people
2006 FIBA World Championship players
2010 FIBA World Championship players
Argentine emigrants to Italy
Argentine expatriate basketball people in Russia
Argentine expatriate basketball people in Spain
Argentine expatriate basketball people in the United States
Argentine expatriate basketball people in Canada
Argentine people of Italian descent
Argentine men's basketball players
Auxilium Pallacanestro Torino players
Basketball players at the 2004 Summer Olympics
Basketball players at the 2008 Summer Olympics
Basketball players at the 2012 Summer Olympics
Basketball players at the 2016 Summer Olympics
BC Khimki players
Boca Juniors basketball players
Detroit Pistons draft picks
Detroit Pistons players
Italian expatriate basketball people in Canada
Fortitudo Pallacanestro Bologna players
Houston Rockets players
Italian expatriate basketball people in Russia
Italian expatriate basketball people in Spain
Italian expatriate basketball people in the United States
Italian men's basketball players
Lega Basket Serie A players
Liga ACB players
Milwaukee Bucks players
Medalists at the 2004 Summer Olympics
Medalists at the 2008 Summer Olympics
National Basketball Association players from Argentina
Citizens of Italy through descent
Olimpia de Venado Tuerto basketball players
Olympic basketball players of Argentina
Olympic bronze medalists for Argentina
Olympic gold medalists for Argentina
Olympic medalists in basketball
Saski Baskonia players
Shooting guards
Small forwards
Sportspeople from Santa Fe, Argentina
Toronto Raptors players
Unión de Santa Fe basketball players
Victoria Libertas Pallacanestro players
Viola Reggio Calabria players